Transmembrane epididymal protein 1 is a transmembrane protein encoded by the TEDDM1 gene. TEDDM1 is also commonly known as TMEM45C and encodes 273 amino acids that contains six alpha-helix transmembrane regions. The protein contains a 118 amino acid length family of unknown function. While the exact function of TEDDM1 is not understood, it is predicted to be an integral component of the plasma membrane.

Gene

Locus 
TEDDM1 is located on chromosome 1 found at 1q25.3 on the minus end. TEDDM1 is composed of a single exon. The gene neighborhood of TEDDM1 includes glutamate-ammonia ligase (GLUL), long intergenic non-protein coding RNA 272 (LINC00272), and Sharpr-MPRA regulatory region 13543 (LOC122149321).

Expression 

TEDDM1 is expressed in most major tissues. The gene is expressed at a high level in the testis and a low level in the heart relative to all other tissues with TEDDM1 expression. In the brain, TEDDM1 is expressed in the amygdala, the hippocampus, and the striatum. In the mouse brain, TEDDM1 was discovered with general expression using an RNA probe. 

Within the cell, TEDDM1 is primarily expressed in the plasma membrane. Similar to other membrane-bound proteins, TEDDM1 protein contains a predicted signal peptide, although the type of signal peptide is unknown. Because TEDDM1 shares many characteristics with other transmembrane proteins, this suggests that the protein may have a role in various cell processes like signal transduction and protein trafficking.

Gene Level Regulation 
The expression pattern of TEDDM1 was ubiquitous. TEDDM1 mRNA abundance was moderate to low in humans.

Protein 
The molecular weight of the TEDDM1 protein is approximately 31.3 kDa and the theoretical isoelectric point (pI) of TEDDM1 is 8.02. Notably, this is different than the average pI of other proteins as their pI land in the pH range of 4-7. This suggests that TEDDM1 protein contains an excess of basic amino acids relative to most proteins.

Domains 
TEDDM1 has a single major domain of unknown function entitled DUF716. This domain spans from amino acid position 95 to 219 of the protein. DUF716 contains the majority of a leucine zipper which is typically associated with dimerization of the protein. DUF716 also contains three of the six transmembrane regions in the protein, and contains amino acid segments of high conservation, suggesting DUF716 likely plays an important role in TEDDM1 protein function.

Post Translational Modifications 
TEDDM1 is subject to several post translational modifications. There are eighteen predicted phosphorylation sites. Other specific sites include an N-glycosylation site, a casein kinase II phosphorylation site, a Leucine zipper pattern, two N-myristylation sites, and three protein kinase C phosphorylation sites. N-glycosylation is another typical feature of membrane proteins and is involved in secretion and cytoskeletal organization. Casein kinase II is involved with protein stability and cell signaling response. Leucine zippers are sequence motifs that facilitate protein-protein interactions. N-myristylation sites are involved in ligand binding and protein dynamics. Protein kinase C phosphorylation has to do with regulation of cell proliferation and gene expression.

Structure 
The secondary structure of TEDDM1 begins with free random coils at the N-terminus and a single alpha helix. The six transmembrane proteins in TEDDM1 are characterized as structurally similar alpha helices. This region of the protein is quite condensed relative to the N-terminus. Alpha helices typically have mainly hydrophobic residues, which aligns with these regions being located within the plasma membrane. Alpha helices are also commonly associated with DNA binding motifs.

Homology/Evolution

Paralogs 
TEDDM1 has two known paralogs, TMEM45A and TMEM45B.

Orthologs 
Over 100 orthologs exist for human gene TEDDM1. Of these known orthologs they were found only to exist in mammals, amphibians, and fish.The divergence date of all orthologs found were compared relative to Homo sapiens. Fish TEDDM1 are the most distantly related orthologs to Human TEDDM1, with the furthest median date of divergence being 464 million years ago. While orthologs for TEDDM1 exist in bony fish, as evidenced by its existence in Protopterus annectens, orthologs of the gene were far more frequently found in cartilaginous fish.

Evolution 

The relative rate of molecular evolution of TEDDM1 was quite similar to that of Fibrinogen Alpha and much more rapid than the evolution rate of Cytochrome C.

Interacting Proteins 
Predicted functional partners to the TEDDM1 protein found via STRING.

Clinical Significance 
According to previous cancer research studies, gene-based association analyses discovered that TEDDM1 along with GLUL are the two genes most significantly correlated with hepatitis B virus related hepatocellular carcinoma, the most common form of liver cancer. TEDDM1 also has significant clinical significance due to its involvement with keratinocytes and the inhibition of microRNA-31, an important regulator of embryonic implantation and development.

References